Oak Harbor is a village in Ottawa County, Ohio, United States. Oak Harbor is 30 miles east of Downtown Toledo. The population was 2,759 at the 2010 census. It lies a short distance southwest of the Davis-Besse Nuclear Power Station, one of two nuclear power plants in Ohio.

Geography
Oak Harbor is located at  (41.512773, -83.146578).

The Portage River flows through Oak Harbor on its way to Lake Erie at Port Clinton.

Demographics

2010 census
As of the census of 2010, there were 2,759 people, 1,153 households, and 738 families residing in the village. The population density was 1,780.0 inhabitants per square mile (687.3/km2). There were 1,262 housing units at an average density of 814.2 per square mile (314.4/km2). The racial makeup of the village was 97.5% White, 0.3% African American, 0.1% Native American, 0.1% Asian, 0.5% from other races, and 1.4% from two or more races. Hispanic or Latino of any race were 2.9% of the population.

There were 1,153 households, of which 33.8% had children under the age of 18 living with them, 45.9% were married couples living together, 13.7% had a female householder with no husband present, 4.4% had a male householder with no wife present, and 36.0% were non-families. In addition, 32.0% of all households and 18% had someone living alone who was 65 years of age or older. The average household size was 2.39, and the average family size was 3.03.

The median age in the village was 39.2 years. 26.4% of residents were under 18; 8% were between 18 and 24; 23.5% were from 25 to 44; 25.5% were from 45 to 64, and 16.7% were 65 years of age or older. The gender makeup of the village was 46.5% male and 53.5% female.

Education
Benton-Carroll-Salem School District operates one elementary school, one middle school and Oak Harbor High School.

The village has a public library, the Oak Harbor Public Library Central Library.

Arts and culture
Oak Harbor is home to the annual Apple Festival which is held in early October. Many apple themed events are scheduled, including the "Apple Run", a five-kilometer race on the Sunday of the festival.

Notable people
Jacob Wukie, 2021 US Olympic archery team silver medalist
Joel Matthias Konzen (born 1950), Roman Catholic bishop, was born in Oak Harbor.
Charles H. Graves (born 1872), Ohio Secretary of State between 1911 & 1915, graduated from Oak Harbor High School
Crystal Bowersox, singer-songwriter, runner up on American Idol
Jessica Studer, participant on Season 10 of Married at First Sight
Kenn Kaufman (born 1954), naturalist, author,magazine columnist and conservationist 
Kimberly Kaufman naturalist, coauthor, conservationist. She is the director of the Black Swamp Bird Observatory headquartered in Oak Harbor, and is married to Kenn Kaufman

References

1 https://www.cleveland.com/olympics/2012/07/oak_harbors_jacob_wukie_helps.html

External links
 Village website
 Chamber of commerce
 Benton-Carrol-Salem School District

Villages in Ottawa County, Ohio
Villages in Ohio